Narayan Tilakchand Kuche is a member of the 13th Maharashtra Legislative Assembly. He represents the Badnapur Assembly Constituency. He belongs to the Bharatiya Janata Party. He is a very popular MLA of Badnapur, mostly in the villages.

References

Maharashtra MLAs 2014–2019
Bharatiya Janata Party politicians from Maharashtra
Living people
People from Marathwada
People from Jalna district
Marathi politicians
Year of birth missing (living people)